The Jono El Grande Orchestra was formed in 2000 by composer Jono El Grande. TJEGO exclusively performs Jono El Grande's music and consists of selected musicians who have played with Oslo Philharmonic Orchestra, Oslo Sinfonietta and Poing. 

Involved musicians from 2000 - 2012 (in scoral part order):

 Jono El Grande - guitars, vocals & conducting
 Hans Martin Austestad - vocals
 Bård Bratlie - vocals & kazoo
 Stefan Ibsen Zlatanos – vocals, flute & piano
 Sjur Odden Skjeldal - vocals & performance dance
 Kjell Asbjørn Bunæs - flute
 Lise Herland - oboe
 Anne-Sofie Halvorsen - bass clarinet
 Lars Frank - bass clarinet, soprano, tenor & baritone saxophone
 Rolf Borch - clarinet Bb & bass clarinet
 Embrik Snerte - bassoon
 Erik Løkra - soprano, tenor & baritone saxophone
 Rolf-Erik Nystrøm - sopranino, alto & baritone saxophone
 Hallvard M. Godal - baritone saxophone
 Karl Strømme - trumpet
 Tarjei Grimsby - trombone
 Øyvind Brække - trombone
 Tomas Gantelius - piano & synth
 André Bongard - keyboards
 Andreas Ulvo - keyboards
 Petter Sørlie Kragstad - keyboards
 Lars Andreas Aspesæter – Fender Rhodes
 Thor Kvande - synth & Fender Rhodes
 Ståle Liavik Solberg - drums
 Terje Engen - drums
 Thomas Dulsrud – drums
 Ole Henrik Moe – saw
 Håkon Mørch Stene - xylophone, vibraphone & percussion
 Erik Fossen Nilsen - xylophone, vibraphone & percussion
 Kjell Tore Innervik - xylophone
 Anders Kregnes Hansen - vibraphone
 Ida Kristine Hansen - violin I
 Isa Caroline Holmesland - violin II
 Karin Hellqvist - violin I & II
 Gunnhild Oddbjørnsdatter Nordahl - viola
 Lars Bryngelsson - viola
 Cecilia Anne Wilder - viola
 Lisa Isabel Holstad - cello
 Kaja Pettersen - cello
 Eivind Henjum - bass
 Sigurd Dale - bass
 Håkon Thelin - double bass

Musical groups established in 2000
2000 establishments in Norway
Musical groups from Oslo